Friedo Dörfel (19 February 1915 – 8 November 1980) was a German international footballer.

References

1915 births
1980 deaths
Association football forwards
German footballers
Germany international footballers
Hamburger SV players